Canterbury Road is a major arterial road through eastern Melbourne, linking the inner eastern suburbs to the outer eastern fringe at the western foot of the Dandenong Ranges.

Route
Canterbury Road starts at the intersection with Burke and Rathmines Roads in Camberwell and runs east as a dual-lane, single-carriageway road until its intersection with Stanhope Grove, where it widens to a four-lane, single-carriageway road and continues east, underneath the Lilydale and Belgrave railway lines at Canterbury, through Surrey Hills until it reaches the intersection with Middleborough Road at the south-eastern corner of Box Hill. It widens to a four-lane, dual-carriageway road and continues east until Blackburn Road in Blackburn, where it widens further to a six-lane, dual-carriageway road. It continues east through Forest Hills and Heathmont, narrowing back to a four-lane, dual-carriageway road east of Dorset Road in Bayswater North and continuing east through Kilsyth, before eventually terminating at the intersection with Mount Dandenong Road in Montrose.

History
The Country Roads Board (later VicRoads) declared the western section of Canterbury Road, between Burke Road in Camberwell and Warrigal Road in Surrey Hills as a Main Road in the 1959/60 financial year. Construction of a steel and reinforced concrete rail-over-road overpass bridge replacing the level crossing with the Lilydale and Belgrave railway lines in Canterbury, was completed by Victorian Railways, with the Board lowering the road surface under it and carrying out improvements to adjacent streets, in the 1969/70 financial year.

Canterbury Road was signed as Metropolitan Route 32 between Camberwell and Montrose in 1965, originally heading further east along Swansea Road to Lilydale; with Victoria's conversion to the newer alphanumeric system in the late 1990s, the section between Montrose and Lilydale was replaced by route C401 and the route was truncated back to Montrose.

The passing of the Road Management Act 2004 granted the responsibility of overall management and development of Victoria's major arterial roads to VicRoads: in 2004, VicRoads re-declared Canterbury Road (Arterial #5802) from Burke Road in Camberwell to Mount Dandenong Road in Montrose.

Canterbury Road Upgrade
In 2016, the Australian Government committed $20 million to build a third lane outbound along Canterbury Road from Dorset Road to Montrose Road and to upgrade the Montrose roundabout to a signalised intersection. In 2018, the Australian Government committed a further $24.5 million to build a third lane inbound along Canterbury Road from Liverpool Road to Dorset Road.

Major intersections

See also

Notes and references

Streets in Melbourne
Shopping districts and streets in Australia
Transport in the City of Whitehorse
Transport in the City of Boroondara
Transport in the City of Maroondah